Lyubim is a town and the administrative center of Lyubimsky District in Yaroslavl Oblast, Russia, located by the Obnora River (a tributary of the Kostroma River). Population:

History
Known since 1546, it was granted town status in 1777.

Administrative and municipal status
Within the framework of administrative divisions, Lyubim serves as the administrative center of Lyubimsky District. As an administrative division, it is incorporated within Lyubimsky District as the town of district significance of Lyubim. As a municipal division, the town of district significance of Lyubim, together with Lyubimsky Rural Okrug (which comprises seventeen rural localities), is incorporated within Lyubimsky Municipal District as Lyubim Urban Settlement.

Economy
Lyubim is home to a railway station and some wood-processing industry.

References

Notes

Sources

Cities and towns in Yaroslavl Oblast
Lyubimsky Uyezd